Scott Campbell (born December 28, 1973), known professionally as Scott C., is an American artist and production designer, known for his work for LucasArts and Double Fine Productions.

Early life
Born and raised in San Jose, California, Scott studied illustration at the Academy of Art University in San Francisco and graduated with a BFA in Illustration focusing on comic and children's book illustration in 1992.

Career
After graduation, Campbell began at LucasArts as concept artist on children's Star Wars games. In 2000, he left to join Tim Schafer at Double Fine Productions as Art Director on such games as 2005's Psychonauts and 2009's Brütal Legend. Alongside this career in games, he has been involved in comics (including being featured in the comic anthology Flight) and created paintings that have appeared in galleries around the world as well the alternative DVD cover for The King of Kong: A Fistful of Quarters.

Bibliography
Hug Machine, Atheneum Books for Young Readers, 2014, 
"Amazing Everything!", (Insight Editions, 2011)
"Zombie in Love", illustrated, (Atheneum Books for Young Readers, 2011)
Flight (comics) #8,  contributed the story "Igloo Head and Tree Head in Accomplishments" (Ballantine Books, 2011 )
Beasts!: Book One, (Fantagraphics, 2008)
Double Fine Action Comics, (Nerdcore, 2008)
Flight #5, contributed the story "Igloo Head and Tree Head in Disguise"  (Ballantine Books, 2007)
Flight #4, contributed the story "Igloo Head and Tree Head" (Ballantine Books, 2006)
Project Superior, contributed the story "Pretty OK Team", (Adhouse Books, 2005)
Hickee, (Alternative Comics, 2003)

Video games
 Psychonauts (2005) (art director)
 Brütal Legend (2009) (art director)
 Once Upon a Monster (2011) (Concept art)
 Psychonauts 2 (2021) (Concept art)

Awards
Winner: 2007 Society of Illustrators Silver Medal in the Sequential Art (for the story  "Igloo Head and Tree Head" from the fourth edition of Flight)
Nominated 2007 Ignatz Award for Promising New Talent

References

External links

Scott Campbell's blog
Scott Campell's daily comic at www.doublefine.com
Scott Campbell at www.nineteeneightyeight.com
Interview: Scott Campbell at www.diskursdisko.de
INTERVIEW: Scott Campbell at inkmountain.wordpress.com 
An interview with Scott C. of Psychonauts and Brütal Legend at www.kwanzoo.com 
Inner View at badluxury.blogspot.com 
Scott Campbell Art www.fun-in-the-murky.com

1973 births
Living people
American illustrators
American production designers
Artists from San Jose, California
Artists from New York City
Academy of Art University alumni
Double Fine people
Video game artists